The 2008–09 Morgan State Bears men's basketball team represented Morgan State University in the 2008–09 college basketball season. This was head coach Todd Bozeman's third season at Morgan State. The Bears competed in the Mid-Eastern Athletic Conference and played their home games at Talmadge L. Hill Field House. They finished the season 23–12, 13–3 in MEAC play to win the regular season championship. They also won the 2009 MEAC men's basketball tournament to receive the conferences automatic bid to the 2009 NCAA Division I men's basketball tournament. They received the No. 15 seed in the South Region where they lost to No. 2 seed and AP #7 Oklahoma in the first round.

Roster

Source

Schedule and results

|-
!colspan=9 style=| Regular season

|-
!colspan=9 style=| MEAC tournament

|-
!colspan=10 style=| NCAA tournament

Source

References

Morgan State Bears
Morgan State
Morgan State Bears men's basketball seasons
Morgan
Morgan